Acron may refer to:

Business
Acron Group, Russian and global mineral fertiliser company

People
Acron, son of Xenon, an ancient Greek physician
Acron or Acro, a king of the Caeninenses, whom Romulus slew in battle - see Epithets of Jupiter
Helenius Acron, 2nd century commentator
Otto Acron (born 1935), Australian strongman

Places
Acron, Florida, a ghost town in the US

Science
Prostomium or "acron", the first body segment of Annelid worms
Acrosome or "acron", the anterior part of a spermatozoon

See also
Akron (disambiguation)
Acorn
Acorn (disambiguation)